Skoryukovo is a rural locality (a village) in Yenangskoye Rural Settlement, Kichmengsko-Gorodetsky District, Vologda Oblast, Russia. The population was 43 as of 2002.

Geography 
Skoryukovo is located 78 km southeast of Kichmengsky Gorodok (the district's administrative centre) by road. Kolotovshchina is the nearest rural locality.

References 

Rural localities in Kichmengsko-Gorodetsky District